Elizabeth Rogers' Virginal Book is a musical commonplace book compiled in the mid-seventeenth century by a person or persons so far unidentified. Of all the so-called English "virginal books" this is the only one to mention the name of the instrument (the virginal) in the title, the others being so-called at a far later date.

The manuscript

The manuscript is a folio volume of sixty pre-lined pages of six staves containing 94 pieces for keyboard and 18 Voycall [vocal] Lessons. It was rebound using part of the original covers, in 1949. The first page bears the inscription Elizabeth Rogers hir virginall booke. February ye 27 1656. However, on the same page the name Elizabeth Fayre is written, and it has been suggested that these two Elizabeths are the same person, before and after marriage.

There are various other writings, including the name "John Tillett", who may have been  a subsequent owner of the manuscript, some poetic fragments, and a note concerning the tuning of the viol. There are also three incomplete tables of contents. Four different hands have been discerned.

The manuscript is now in the British Library, catalogued as Add MS 10337. The American Institute of Musicology published an edited version by George Sargent in 1971.

Contents

The pieces contained in the manuscript are relatively simple, and written for the amateur performer. There are settings of popular tunes, dance movements and vocal pieces. None of the keyboard pieces bear a composer's name, and only a few of the vocal pieces are attributed, but many are identifiable from other sources. These include: William Byrd, with his Battel suite, dating from at least 1591; Orlando Gibbons; Henry Lawes and his brother William; Robert Johnson; and Nicholas Lanier. Several pieces are attributed to Thomas Strengthfield, of whom nothing is known, but who may have been Elizabeth's music teacher. Other pieces are attributed to John Balls (died 1622), a wait or public musician of the city of London; and John Wilson, who replaced him.

Sr Tho: ffairfax Marche
Nanns Maske (Orlando Gibbons)
Almaygne
The ffairest Nimphes the valleys or mountaines euer bred, & c.
The Scots Marche
Prince Ruperts Martch
One of ye Symphon(ies)
One of ye Symphon(ies) (William Lawes)
Selebrand (Sarabande)
When the King enioyes his owne againe
Almaygne
A Trumpett tune
Essex last goodnight
Almaygne per Tho: Strengthfield
The Corrant to ye last Alm(aygne) per Tho: Strengthfield
Ruperts Retraite
Almaygne per Tho: Strengthfield
Corrant to ye former Alma(ygne) per Tho: Strengthfield
[Untitled]
The Nightingale
Corrant Bear
Selebrand Beare
Corrant Beare
Almayne
Corrant
Corrant Beare
Corrant Beare
The Battaile (William Byrd): The Souldiars summons
The Martch of ffoote
(The) Martch (of) horse
The Trumpetts
The Irish Martch
Bagpipes
The Drum and fflute
The Martch (to) ye ffight
Tarra-tantarra
(The) Battell Joyned
Retrait
The Buriing of the dead
The Souldiers delight
Corrant
Selebrand
A Maske
Corrant
Selebrand
Ly still my Deare
The Chestnut
Cloris sight (sighed)
Now ye springe is comne
Oh Iesu meeke
Corrant
Corrant
Maske
Corrant
Almaygne
Lupus Ayre (Thomas Lupo?)
Could thine incomparable eye
Almaygne: Mr Johnson (Orlando Gibbons)
Mock-Nightingale
What if the King should come to ye City
The Kings Complaint
Almaygne
Corrant
Selebrand
My delyght
A Scotts Tuen
An Irish Toy
Allmayne
The spaynard (Spaniard)
[Untitled]
Selabrand
The ffinex (Phoenix)
The faithfull Brothers
A Corant
This soldier loues
Carron o carron (Charon)
A horne pipe
Almaygne
Corrant per Tho: Strengthfield
Selebrand
Almaine
Corant
Almaygne
I wish noe more (Nicolas Lanier)
[Untitled]
Selebrand
Loue is strange
Almaygne Mercure
Glory of ye North
Almaine
Merceur (Mercury)
Corrant
Corrant
Phill: Porters Lamentation
Psalme 42 (William Lawes)
Must your faire
Since tis my fate
No flattring pellow
Baloo my boy
Ile wish no more
Deerest loue
No noe I tell ye no
O that myne eyes
Yes I could loue
Lett god the god of Battaile Rize
Sing to the king of kings (William Lawes)
Psalme 39. verse 12 (William Lawes)
I preethe sweete (Henry Lawes)
fyer (Nicholas Lanier: lyrics by Thomas Campion)
Come you pritty (Thomas Campion)
All you forsaken louers
Think not deare (William and Henry Lawes)

See also

 The Mulliner Book
 The Dublin Virginal Manuscript
 My Ladye Nevells Booke
 Susanne van Soldt Manuscript
 Clement Matchett's Virginal Book
 Fitzwilliam Virginal Book
 Parthenia
 Priscilla Bunbury's Virginal Book
 Anne Cromwell's Virginal Book

References

Further reading
 Elizabeth Rogers hir Virginall Booke, edited by Charles J. F. Cofone. New York: Dover Publications, 1975. . Contains an introduction and transcription of the entire MS.

Books on English music
Compositions for harpsichord
Compositions for keyboard
Renaissance music manuscript sources
British Library additional manuscripts